Rugby League in Yorkshire refers to the sport of rugby league in relation to its participation and history within Yorkshire, England.  The traditional county is the largest in the United Kingdom and as thus has many rugby clubs, professional and amateur.

History

Rugby league was founded in Yorkshire in 1895 at the George Hotel in Huddersfield when 22 clubs broke away from the Rugby Football Union to form the Northern Rugby Football Union which later changed its name to the Rugby Football League.

The first winners of the newly formed league, the NRFU Championship were Bradford based team Manningham FC in 1895. Between 1896 and 1900 teams either played in the Yorkshire or Lancashire League depending on geographical location but still competed in the Challenge Cup. In the early years of the competition Huddersfield were a dominant force, winning multiple league titles between 1910s and 1940s.

In the Super League era, Bradford Bulls were one of the dominant forces in the early years winning four titles between 1997 and 2005. Leeds Rhinos became the most successful team in Yorkshire winning eight Super League titles and winning 14 Challenge Cups.

Competitions

Yorkshire League

The Yorkshire League was founded in 1895 for teams in Yorkshire to compete in. Leeds and Huddersfield dominated the league before it was abandoned in 1970 due to the amount of fixtures being played.

Yorkshire Cup

The Yorkshire Cup was a cup competition for teams in Yorkshire. The competition ran from 1905–1992 when it folded due to the number of fixtures in the calendar and the Rugby Football League (RFL) not seeing it as being a part of the future of modern rugby league.

War of the Roses
 
The War of the Roses, was the inter-county rugby league matches between representative teams from Yorkshire and Lancashire, the areas where rugby league has traditionally been most popular in England. The fixture was abandoned in 2003 after poor attendances and lack of interest from players and the media.

Rugby league clubs in Yorkshire

The table below lists clubs located within the traditional borders of Yorkshire in the top three tiers of the British rugby league system: from the top division (the Super League), down to tier 3 of League 1.

Locations

West Yorkshire

West Yorkshire has the most clubs in the whole of Yorkshire with 11 teams based in the region. Traditionally, Leeds Rhinos and Huddersfield Giants have been the two most successful, Bradford Bulls also became a dominant force in rugby league during the Super League era along with Leeds.

East Riding of Yorkshire

Two teams are based in the East Riding of Yorkshire and both play in Kingston upon Hull. Traditionally Hull F.C. are said to represent the West side of the city and Hull Kingston Rovers represent the East side of the city with the boundary being the River Hull.

South Yorkshire

Two clubs compete and are based in South Yorkshire; Sheffield Eagles and Doncaster. Doncaster play at the Keepmoat Stadium in Doncaster whereas Sheffield play at the Sheffield Olympic Legacy Stadium in Sheffield. Sheffield Eagles are the most successful of the two teams having won the 1996 Challenge Cup. Doncaster have yet to win any major honours.

North Yorkshire

The only side in North Yorkshire is currently York City Knights (previously York) but sides have existed in Ripon and Scarborough.

See also
Rugby league in the British Isles
Rugby league in England
Rugby league in Lancashire